Ferdinand Reich (19 February 1799 – 27 April 1882) was a German chemist who co-discovered indium in 1863 with Hieronymous Theodor Richter.

Reich was born in Bernburg and died in Freiberg.  He was color blind, or could only see in whites and blacks, and that is why Theodor Richter became his science partner.  Richter would examine the colors produced in reactions that they studied.

Reich and Richter ended up isolating the indium, creating a small supply, although it was later found in more regions.  They isolated the indium at the Freiberg University of Mining and Technology in Germany.

Further reading

 - subscription required

19th-century German chemists
1799 births
1882 deaths
Discoverers of chemical elements
Academic staff of the Freiberg University of Mining and Technology
Indium